Haas may refer to:

People
 Haas (surname)
 Haas Visser 't Hooft (1905–1977), Dutch field hockey player

Auto racing
 Haas F1 Team, a 21st-century Formula 1 auto racing team
 Haas Lola, a 20th-century Formula 1 auto racing team
 Newman/Haas Racing, an Indycar auto racing team
 Stewart-Haas Racing, a NASCAR auto racing team

Companies and organizations
 Haas Automation, a machine tool company
 Haas Center for Public Service, of Stanford University in Stanford, California
 Haas School of Business at the University of California, Berkeley
 Haas Type Foundry, a Swiss manufacturer of foundry type

Science and technology
 Haas (rocket), a Romanian launch system
 Haas effect, a psychoacoustic effect
 de Haas–van Alphen effect, a quantum mechanical effect
 Einstein–de Haas effect
 Shubnikov–de Haas effect, a macroscopic manifestation of quantum mechanics

Other
 Haas House, a building in Vienna, Austria
 Haas–Lilienthal House, a house in San Francisco, California
 Haas Pavilion at the University of California, Berkeley
 USS Haas (DE-424), World War II US Navy destroyer escort

See also

 Team Haas (disambiguation)
 Hass (disambiguation)
 Has (disambiguation)
 HAA (disambiguation)
 H2A (disambiguation)